Dillwyn Thomas (13 February 1905 – 29 August 1996) was a Welsh cricketer.  Thomas was a right-handed batsman who bowled right-arm medium-fast.  He was born at Neath Abbey, Glamorgan.

Thomas made his first-class debut for Glamorgan in 1939 against Essex, where on debut he took his only five-wicket haul in first-class cricket, claiming figures of 5/64; this five wicket haul also accounted for all of his first-class wickets. He played a further first-class match for the county, against Yorkshire in the same season at Park Avenue Cricket Ground, Bradford.

Thomas died at Neath, Glamorgan on 29 August 1996.

References

External links
Dillwyn Thomas at Cricinfo
Dillwyn Thomas at CricketArchive

1905 births
1996 deaths
Cricketers from Neath
Welsh cricketers
Glamorgan cricketers